Andrew Philip Kehoe (February 1, 1872 – May 18, 1927) was an American mass murderer. Kehoe was a Michigan farmer who became disgruntled after losing reelection as treasurer of the Bath Township school board. He subsequently murdered his wife and then detonated bombs at the Bath Consolidated School on May 18, 1927, resulting in the Bath School disaster. Thirty-eight children and six adults were killed while fifty-eight more people were injured. Kehoe committed suicide near the school by detonating dynamite in his truck, causing an explosion which killed several other people and wounded more. He had earlier set off incendiary devices in his house and farm, destroying all the buildings and killing several farm animals.

Early life and education
Kehoe was born in Tecumseh, Michigan, among the younger of a family of 13 children. His parents were Philip Kehoe (1833–1915) and Mary (McGovern) Kehoe (1835–1890). He attended Tecumseh High School and Michigan State College (later Michigan State University), where he studied electrical engineering. There, he first met his future wife, Ellen "Nellie" Price, the daughter of a wealthy Lansing family.

After college, Kehoe went southwest, apparently working for several years as an electrician in St. Louis, Missouri. During this period, in 1911, he suffered a severe head injury in a fall which resulted in him being in a coma for two weeks.

Kehoe then moved back in with his father after the injury. During Kehoe's time away his mother had died and his father had married Frances Wilder, whom Kehoe did not like. On September 17, 1911, Frances was severely burned when the family's stove exploded as she was attempting to light it. The fuel soaked her, with her body catching fire. Kehoe threw water from a nearby bucket on her; due to the oil-based nature of the fire, the water did nothing to put the flames out. Frances later died from her injuries, with allegations being made that the stove had been tampered with.

Marriage and family
After his return to Michigan, in 1912 he married Nellie Price. In 1919 the couple bought a  farm outside the village of Bath from Nellie's aunt for $12,000 (equivalent to $ in ). He paid $6,000 in cash and took out a $6,000 mortgage.

Personality 
Kehoe was regarded by his neighbors as a highly intelligent man who grew impatient and angry with those who disagreed with him. Neighbors recalled that Kehoe was always neat, dressed meticulously, and was known to change his shirt at midday or whenever it became even slightly dirty. Neighbors also recounted how Kehoe was cruel to his farm animals, having once beaten a horse to death. The Kehoes initially attended services at the Catholic church in Bath, but he refused to pay the church's parish assessment of members and prevented his wife from attending.

Kehoe's neighbors thought he preferred mechanical tinkering to farming. His neighbor M. J. "Monty" Ellsworth wrote in his account of the disaster,

Recent analysis labels him a dangerous "injustice collector:" a person who remembers slights and holds a grudge for a long time. While many people may hold grudges, it becomes dangerous when a person begins to feel like a victim and lashes out.

Bath Consolidated School administration 
With a reputation for thrift, Kehoe was elected treasurer of the Bath Consolidated School board in 1924. While on the board, Kehoe fought for lower taxes and was often at cross purposes with other board members, voting against them and calling for adjournment when he did not get his way. He repeatedly accused superintendent Emory Huyck of financial mismanagement.

While on the school board, Kehoe was appointed as the Bath Township Clerk in 1925 for a short period. In the spring 1926 election, he was defeated for the position, and was angered by his public defeat. His neighbor Ellsworth thought Kehoe started planning his "murderous revenge" against the community at that time. Another neighbor, A. McMullen, noticed that Kehoe stopped working altogether on his farm in his last year, and thought he might be planning suicide.

During these years, Nellie Kehoe was chronically ill with tuberculosis, and had frequent hospital stays—at the time there was no effective treatment or cure for the disease. By the time of the Bath School disaster, Kehoe had ceased making mortgage and homeowner's insurance payments. The mortgage lender had begun foreclosure proceedings against the farm.

Bath School disaster 

The Bath School disaster is the name given to a series of explosions perpetrated by Kehoe on May 18, 1927, in Bath Township, Michigan, which killed 45 people including Kehoe himself, and injured at least 58. Most of the victims were children in the second to sixth grades (7–12 years of age) attending the Bath Consolidated School. The disaster remains the deadliest act of mass murder in a school in U.S. history.

Kehoe killed his wife between May 16, when she returned home from a hospital stay, and the morning of May 18. He moved her body to a farm building before setting off incendiary explosions in their house and farm buildings. About the same time, he had arranged timed explosions in the new school building. The materials in the north wing exploded as planned, killing many students and some adults inside. Kehoe had set a timed detonator to ignite dynamite and hundreds of pounds of pyrotol at the school, which he had secretly bought and planted in the basement of both wings over the course of many months. The second  of explosives in the south wing did not detonate, so that part of the school was not destroyed.

As rescuers started gathering at the school, Kehoe drove up and stopped his truck. During a struggle with Superintendent Huyck, Kehoe detonated dynamite stored inside his shrapnel-filled truck, killing himself and Huyck, as well as killing and injuring several others (among them a boy who had survived the initial bombing). During the rescue efforts, searchers discovered the additional  of unexploded dynamite and pyrotol planted throughout the basement of the school's south wing. These explosives, connected to an alarm clock that was supposed to act as the detonator, had been set for the same time as the other explosion.

After the bombings, investigators found a wooden sign wired to the farm's fence with Kehoe's last message, "Criminals are made, not born," stenciled on it. When investigators were done taking an inventory of the Kehoe estate, they estimated that, prior to its destruction, sale of the unused equipment and materials on the farm would have yielded enough money to pay off the Kehoes' mortgage.

One of Kehoe's sisters claimed his remains and arranged for burial without ceremony in an unmarked grave at Mount Rest Cemetery in St. Johns, Michigan. The Price family claimed Nellie's remains and had her body buried in Lansing, under her maiden name.

See also
 List of school massacres by death toll

Notes

References

External links 
 
 

1872 births
1927 suicides
20th-century American criminals
American murderers of children
American spree killers
Bombers (people)
Burials in Michigan
Criminals from Michigan
Deaths by car bomb in the United States
Farmers from Michigan
Suicide bombers
Michigan State University alumni
Murder–suicides in Michigan
People from Clinton County, Michigan
People from Tecumseh, Michigan
School board members in Michigan
Suicides by explosive device
Suicides in Michigan
Catholics from Michigan